Henri Zisly (born in Paris, 2 November 1872; died in 1945) was a French individualist anarchist and naturist. He participated alongside Henri Beylie and  Émile Gravelle in many journals such as La Nouvelle Humanité and La Vie Naturelle, which promoted anarchist-naturism.

Zisly's political activity, "primarily aimed at supporting a return to 'natural life' through writing and practical involvement, stimulated lively confrontations within and outside the anarchist environment. Zisly vividly criticized progress and civilization, which he regarded as 'absurd, ignoble, and filthy.' He openly opposed industrialization, arguing that machines were inherently authoritarian, defended nudism, advocated a non-dogmatic and non-religious adherence to the 'laws of nature,' recommended a lifestyle based on limited needs and self-sufficiency, and disagreed with vegetarianism, which he considered 'anti-scientific.'"

Works
En Conquête de l'état naturel, 1899
Voyage au beau pays de Naturie, 1900
La Conception du naturisme libertaire, 1920
Naturisme pratique dans la civilisation, 1928

See also

 La Clairière de Vaux

References 

1872 births
1945 deaths
Critics of vegetarianism
Egoist anarchists
French anarchists
French naturists
Green anarchists
Individualist anarchists
Writers from Paris